Armavir is a military airfield in Krasnodar Territory, located on the southern outskirts of the city Armavir. The 713th Training Aviation Regiment is based at the aerodrome, which is part of the 783rd Training Center. The regiment instructors provide training for fighter aircraft on the Yak-130 L-39 and MiG-29 aircraft.

The possibility is being discussed of creating an Armavir airport by reconstructing the military aerodrome and bringing it into compliance with the standards of civil aviation aerodromes.

Accidents and disasters
 September 14, 2006: in the area of Armavir city, a L-39 training aircraft crashed during a scheduled training flight. A cadet ejected and the pilot-instructor Dmitry Khrebtov died.
 February 1, 2008: a L-39 crashed. During the performance of a flight task, the engine stopped. After two unsuccessful attempts to restart, the pilot took the plane to a safe area and Second-class pilot Major Serov safely ejected.
 September 4, 2014: in the Armavir region, during a training flight of a MiG-31 aircraft, the landing gear did not lower during the approach to landing. Both pilots ejected and managed to survive. According to the official representative of the Russian Defense Ministry Igor Konashenkov, the pilots were quickly found and taken by helicopter to the base airfield.

References

Russian Air Force bases
Soviet Air Force bases
Soviet Air Defence Force bases
Airports in Krasnodar Krai